Japanese Engines is the tenth studio album by Mornington Peninsula, Melbourne, Australia indie band The Fauves.

Track listing
All songs by The Fauves.
 "Don't Say When"
 "Ride On Woman"
 "You're My Type"
 "3 Minute Mile"
 "Flag of Convenience"
 "No No No"
 "Lost My Page"
 "The French"
 "Give That I May Grow"
 "Write Yourself Off Today"
 "The Playboy Mansion"

Personnel

 Andrew Cox - guitar, vocals
 Philip Leonard - guitar, vocals
 Adam Newey - drums, vocals
 Timothy Cleaver - bass, vocals

References

The Fauves albums
2011 albums